Apodakos was a king of Characene, a kingdom presumably vassal of the Parthian Empire.

Apodakos is known from his silver and bronze coins, only some of which are dated.
 The dated coins belong to the years 110/09 to 104/3 BC.

In 124 BC, Hyspaosines, the first king of Characene died. After his death, his widow Thalassia tried to install their son on the throne. However, the events surrounding the succession are known from Babylonian cuneiform texts and the name of the son is not mentioned.

Whether Apodakos was the son of Hyspaosines remains undetermined, however, he has certain historicity from about 14 years later, as king of the small kingdom.

Literature 

2nd-century BC rulers in Asia
Kings of Characene
Year of birth missing
Year of death missing
2nd-century BC monarchs in the Middle East
2nd-century BC rulers
2nd-century BC deaths
Vassal rulers of the Parthian Empire